The 2019 Montgomery mayoral election took place on August 28 and October 8, 2019, to elect the Mayor of Montgomery, Alabama.

Incumbent Republican Mayor Todd Strange, who had been elected to three full terms as mayor, did not seek re-election to a fourth full term in office.

The election was officially nonpartisan.

With no candidate receiving a majority of the vote, a runoff election was held between the top two candidates. Two candidates, Montgomery County Probate Judge Steven Reed and businessman David Woods, made it to the October 8 runoff, with Reed winning the runoff.

Reed then became the city's first African-American mayor after being sworn in on November 12, 2019.

Results

First round

Second round

References

Mayoral elections in Montgomery, Alabama
2019 Alabama elections
Montgomery